The Neustadt/Weinstrasse Railway Museum (Eisenbahnmuseum Neustadt/Weinstraße) is one of the two railway museums run by the German Railway History Company, (Deutsche Gesellschaft für Eisenbahngeschichte) or DGEG. It is located in the station at Neustadt an der Weinstraße. The other one is the Bochum Dahlhausen Railway Museum.

The Neustadt/Weinstrasse Railway Museum is housed in the historic locomotive shed of the Palatinate Railway, built in the very earliest days of the railways. in what was then the Bavarian Palatinate or Pfalz. The engine shed is still largely in its original condition.

Exhibits
The focus of the Neustadt/Weinstrasse Railway Museum is vehicles of the former state railways in southern Germany. For example, the two remaining examples of steam locomotives from the time of the Palatine Railways are preserved here still in their original state: the T 1 Schaidt and a Palatine T 5. In addition a replica of an express train locomotive from the early railway period, (Die Pfalz), a Crampton engine, is on display. Vehicles from the Deutsche Reichsbahn era are the E 17 and ET 11. In addition the museum still has a range of passenger train coaches and goods wagons of the former Baden and Royal Württemberg State Railways, as well as the later standard DRG wagons. There is also a 1942 steam-powered rotary snow plough in the fleet.

Little Cuckoo Railway
Restoration and maintenance, upkeep of the buildings and operation of the associated museum railway are carried out by the society members. The preserved railway, called the Little Cuckoo Railway (Kuckucksbähnel), starts at Neustadt and heads into the Palatine Forest, west of Neustadt.

See also 
 History of rail transport in Germany
 Royal Bavarian State Railways
 Palatinate Railway
 List of Palatine locomotives and railbuses
 DGEG

References

External links 
Neustadt/Weinstrasse railway museum home page
DGEG home page

Railway museums in Germany
Heritage railways in Germany
Transport in Rhineland-Palatinate
Museums in Rhineland-Palatinate
Standard gauge railways in Germany
Neustadt an der Weinstraße